Massoni is an Italian surname. Notable people with the surname include:

Carlos Domingos Massoni (born 1939), Brazilian basketball player
Egisto Massoni (1854–1929), Italian painter
Leonardo Massoni (born 1987), Italian footballer
Norberto Massoni (1935–2010), Argentine politician
Philippe Massoni (1936–2015), French politician

See also 

 Masoni (disambiguation)

Italian-language surnames